Fede Galizia, better known as Galizia, ( 1578 –  1630) was an Italian Renaissance painter of still-lifes, portraits, and religious pictures. She is especially noted as a painter of still-lifes of fruit, a genre in which she was one of the earliest practitioners in European art. She is perhaps not as well known as other female artists, such as Angelica Kauffman and Élisabeth Vigée Le Brun, because she did not have access to court-oriented or aristocratic social circles, nor had she sought the particular patronage of political rulers and noblemen.

Life 
Fede Galizia was born in Milan in 1578. Her father, Nunzio Galizia, also a painter of miniatures, had moved to Milan from Trento. Fede (whose name means "faith") learned to paint from him. By the age of twelve, she was sufficiently accomplished as an artist to be mentioned by Gian Paolo Lomazzo, a painter and art theorist friend of her father, who wrote, "[T]his girl dedicates herself to imitate the most extraordinary of our art." By her later teen years, she had established an international reputation as an artist.

At a young age, Galizia was already an established portrait painter handling many commissioned works. Her father may have been inspired to train his daughter by the example of Sofonisba Anguissola, who was from Cremona, around 50 miles from Milan. Perhaps it was her father's influence as a miniaturist that led to Galizia's attention to detail in her portraits. Her treatment of jewels and clothing made her a very desirable portrait painter. She was often commissioned to paint religious and secular themes as well.  Several of her paintings based on the deuterocanonical story of Judith and Holofernes, a popular theme in art of the period, survive in private collections. Perhaps her earliest was Judith with the Head of Holofernes painted in 1596 which is now in Sarasota, Florida at the Ringling Museum of Art.  She also created miniatures and altarpieces for convents. Galizia never married or had any children, instead leaving her life items to a cousin, Anna Galizia, and a nephew, Carlo Henrico. On June 21, 1630, she made her will, and is thought to have died of the plague in Milan shortly afterward.

Style 
 

The style of her painting derived from the naturalistic traditions of the Renaissance in Italy with a sharply realistic approach. Galizia's artistic skills are evident in her portrait of Paolo Morigia, General of the Jesuati, a scholar, writer and historian, and one of her earliest patrons and supporters. Her Portrait of Paolo Morigia (1596) depicts the subject writing a poem about the picture Galizia was painting. She received several public commissions for altarpieces in Milanese churches, including the Noli me tangere (1616; Milan, S. Stefano) made for the altar of Santa Maria Maddalena Church.

When not painting portraits, Galizia was primarily interested in painting still lifes, a genre in which she was a pioneer and for which she is best remembered. Although very few contemporary sources mention Galizia's still life paintings, they are the majority of her surviving works. Sixty-three works have been catalogued as hers, of which 44 are still lifes. Her only known signed still life, made in 1602, is the first known dated still life by an Italian artist. However, her paintings were not given the recognition they deserved until well into the 20th century, when special attention was given to her work in studies made in 1963 and 1989.

Galizia showed a style related to the Lombard mannerism of the late 16th century, centered in Mantua, but known internationally, especially in France. Galizia’s still lifes are among the earliest examples of painting in a new genre in which women, partly because they were excluded from other kinds of painting, would later excel. Galizia’s still lifes differ from her father's works in their greater detail and more vibrant colors. Most of these works featured fruit centrepieces in simple, frontal arrangements. They were often composed of a basket or bowl filled with a single type of fruit, such as peaches or pears, with a few fruit, sometimes sliced, scattered at the base of the bowl.

Many of her still lifes had fresh flowers or other fruits set on the counter to provide a noticeable contrast and scale, as seen in her work titled, Still-life with Peaches and a Porcelain and a Bowl. Galizia's work displayed the influence of such works as Caravaggio's Basket of Fruit.  Associating with the more restrained style of the Counter Reformation period, she did not explore the more lavish compositions and forms taken up by many of her contemporaries working in this genre; she preferred instead a severe compositional style like that seen in Francisco de Zurbarán's slightly later still life paintings.

Galizia’s paintings were deft with detail, perfectly balanced, and her attention to shadow, light, and texture was unrivaled at the time. She was particularly good at creating inviting space in her paintings. Her compositions are not crowded. They look as if one could reach out and touch the fruit, grasp it, and pull it from the painting without disturbing the rest of the work. Her graceful, flowing arrangements were natural and poetic.

Portrait of Paolo Morigia (1596) was painted when Galizia was only eighteen. Each detail of the figure is painted in analytic detail. Galizia employs mimesis (imitation of reality), in the depiction of Morigia’s glasses: lenses' reflection shows the room Morigia is sitting in, and thus heightening the illusion of reality.

Galizia is recognized as a pioneer in the treatment of still-life in European painting. Currently, it is unknown the number of paintings Galizia executed. Many works that could have possibly been hers have been attributed to her male counterpart Panfilo Nuvolone, who drew significant inspiration from Galizia. She may have inspired the Bergamese Francesco Codino and the Baroque still life painter Giovanna Garzoni.

Gallery

References

Bibliography 
  Chadwick, Whitney, Women, Art, and Society, Thames and Hudson, London, 1990 
  Harris, Anne Sutherland and Linda Nochlin, Women Artists: 1550-1950, Los Angeles County Museum of Art, Knopf, New York, 1976

External links 
 Painters of reality: the legacy of Leonardo and Caravaggio in Lombardy, an exhibition catalog from The Metropolitan Museum of Art (fully available online as PDF), which contains material on Galizia (see index)
 

1570s births
1630 deaths
16th-century Italian painters
17th-century Italian painters
Italian still life painters
Italian women painters
Italian Renaissance painters
Painters from Milan
16th-century Italian women artists
17th-century Italian women artists
Catholic painters
Female Catholic artists